Mons Andreas Petersen, best known as Mons Petter (sometimes Mons Peter; April 6, 1829 – November 16, 1886), was a Norwegian Sami farmer that discovered ore deposits in Sulitjelma in 1858.

Mons Petter was a Sami farmer from the Skognes farm in Lakså along the shore of Øvervatnet in what is now the municipality of Fauske—at that time the hundred of Skjerstad. He had noticed veins of rust in the mountains. In 1858, he found ore there that he thought was gold. He took his find to the merchant Bernhard Koch in Venset, who determined that it was not gold based on its weight. In fact, he had found chalcopyrite (a golden yellow copper ore) and pyrite (fool's gold).

The discovery led to the establishment of Sulitjelma Mines, which began operations in 1891.

The Mons Petter Festival is held annually in Sulitjelma in late June to celebrate the area's mining history.

References

External links
 Mons Petter Festival

Norwegian farmers
People from Fauske
1829 births
1886 deaths